{{DISPLAYTITLE:C18H22ClNO}}
The molecular formula C18H22ClNO (molar mass: 303.83 g/mol, exact mass: 303.1390 u) may refer to:

 Chlorphenoxamine (Phenoxene)
 Phenoxybenzamine